The Baháʼí Faith in the United Arab Emirates began before the country gained independence in 1971.  The first Baháʼís arrived in Dubai by 1950, and by 1957 there were four Baháʼí Local Spiritual Assemblies in the region of the United Arab Emirates and a regional National Spiritual Assembly of the Arabian Peninsula. Looklex Encyclopedia estimated some 75,000 Baháʼís or 1.6% of the national population - second only to Iran in number of Baháʼís in the nations of the Middle East - though the Association for Religious Data Archives (relying on World Christian Encyclopedia) estimated closer to 51,700, 1.3%, in 2005. Recent estimates of the ARDA count some 38,364 Baháʼís or 0.5% of the national population.

Development

By 1950 Baháʼís had arrived in Dubai, and by 1957 there were Baháʼí Local Spiritual Assemblies in Dubai, Abu Dhabi, Ras Al Khaymah, and Sharjah,  and a regional Baháʼí National Spiritual Assembly of the Arabian Peninsula. This regional national assembly was re-organized for the Southern and Eastern Arabia in 1967, and of South East Arabia in 1974.

In the 1980s, many anti-Baháʼí polemics were published in local newspapers of the UAE.

Modern community
Since its inception the religion has had involvement in socio-economic development beginning by giving greater freedom to women, promulgating the promotion of female education as a priority concern, and that involvement was given practical expression by creating schools, agricultural coops, and clinics. The religion entered a new phase of activity when a message of the Universal House of Justice dated 20 October 1983 was released. Baháʼís were urged to seek out ways, compatible with the Baháʼí teachings, in which they could become involved in the social and economic development of the communities in which they lived. Worldwide in 1979 there were 129 officially recognized Baháʼí socio-economic development projects. By 1987, the number of officially recognized development projects had increased to 1482. However the current situation of the Baháʼís in the UAE, while being better than the situation of the Baháʼís in Iran, (see Persecution of Baháʼís) is mixed. Many consider the Baháʼís kafir (infidels), and they lack many basic rights.

Census figures count Baháʼís as Muslim and since many Baháʼís had passports that identify them as Muslims, the Ministry of Education required Baháʼí children to take the prescribed Islamic studies classes. However, 15 percent of the UAE are not Muslim, Christian, or Jewish. Unofficial sources noted by the U.S. Department of State assert that one-third of these are collectively Baháʼí, Parsi, or Sikh. These estimates differ from census figures because census figures do not count "temporary" visitors and workers, and Baháʼís are counted as Muslim. By some other estimates there were 55,000 Baháʼís (1.95% of the national population) as of 2000, and 75,000 Baháʼís or 1.6% circa 2008 - second only to Iran in the number of Baháʼís in the nations of the Middle East though the World Christian Encyclopedia estimated 51,700 in 2005. The ARDA estimates some 38,364 Baháʼís in 2010 or 0.5% of the national population.

Recently, Baháʼís have been generally able to practise their religion in the country; in 1999 a touring group of youth, a Baháʼí Workshop (see Oscar DeGruy), with members from many countries including the UAE had performed in India and other places. In February 2001 a group of Baháʼís travelled to the UAE from Iran to attend a Ruhi Institute Baháʼí study circle, and the Emirate of Abu Dhabi donated land for a Baháʼí cemetery (and other cemetery lands for other religions.)

However, as of 2005, the country's long-term Internet service provider at the time, Etisalat, blocked some of the most visible websites related to the Baháʼí Faith. The blocking did not extend to most material concerning the Baháʼí Faith on the internet however.

See also
Baháʼí Faith by country
Religion in the United Arab Emirates
Freedom of religion in the United Arab Emirates
Human rights in the United Arab Emirates

References

Religion in the United Arab Emirates
United Arab Emirates